Eleni Daniilidou was the defending champion but lost to Maria Kirilenko in the semifinals.
Venus Williams won in the final 6–3, 1–6, 6–4 against Maria Kirilenko.

Seeds

Draw

Key
WC - Wildcard
r - Retired

Finals

Section 1

Section 2

External links
 WTA tournament draws
 ITF tournament draws

Korea Open (tennis)
Hansol Korea Open